Andreas Aarflot (born 1 July 1928) is a Norwegian theologian and bishop emeritus in the Church of Norway. He was bishop of Oslo from 1977 to 1998.

Early life
Aarflot was born in Yiyang, China where his mother and father served the Norwegian Missionary Society in the Hunan province. Aarflot earned his cand.theol. from MF Norwegian School of Theology (1951) and dr.theol. from University of Oslo (1970). Furthermore, he has studied in Heidelberg, England and the United States, has an honorary doctor's degree from St. Olaf College (1987) and is an honorary member of Finska kyrkohistoriska sälllskapet (1978).

Aarflot has among other things worked for the Norwegian Seamen's Mission and the Norwegian Lutheran Inner Mission Society, and served as a priest in Røyken. He was connected with the MF Norwegian School of Theology (1960), faculty lecturer (1968) and docent (1970) before he became a professor in 1976. The same year he was proclaimed bishop in the Diocese of Borg after Per Lønning withdrew as a protest on legalizing abortion. Aarflot was decorated as a Commander with Star of the Order of St. Olav in 1979.

References

1928 births
Living people
Norwegian expatriates in China
Bishops of Borg
Bishops of Oslo
MF Norwegian School of Theology, Religion and Society alumni
University of Oslo alumni
Academic staff of the MF Norwegian School of Theology, Religion and Society
20th-century Lutheran bishops
Norwegian expatriates in Germany
Norwegian expatriates in the United Kingdom
Norwegian expatriates in the United States